Andreas Mokdasi (born 8 May 1984) is a Swedish sprinter who specializes in the 400 metres.

He finished fourth in 4 × 400 metres relay at the 2006 IAAF World Indoor Championships, with teammates Joni Jaako, Johan Wissman and Mattias Claesson.

His personal best time is 46.97 seconds, achieved in August 2004 in Karlstad.

External links

1984 births
Living people
Swedish male sprinters
Place of birth missing (living people)
21st-century Swedish people